Patrick Joseph Byrne (2 April 1925 – 19 October 2021) was an Irish politician. An accountant by profession, he was first elected to Dáil Éireann as an independent Teachta Dála (TD) for the Dublin North-East constituency at a by-election on 30 April 1956. The by-election was caused by the death of his father, Alfie Byrne. In 1957 he joined Fine Gael and was re-elected at the 1957, 1961 and 1965 general elections. He did not contest the 1969 general election.

His father Alfie Byrne was an MP, TD, Senator and Lord Mayor of Dublin. His brothers Thomas Byrne and A. P. Byrne were also TDs.

Byrne died on 19 October 2021, at the age of 96. At the time of his death, he was the oldest former TD, the longest surviving Dáil member, and the only surviving member of the 15th Dáil.

See also
Families in the Oireachtas

References

1925 births
2021 deaths
Fine Gael TDs
Independent TDs
Members of the 15th Dáil
Members of the 16th Dáil
Members of the 17th Dáil
Members of the 18th Dáil
Politicians from County Dublin